K86 or K-86 may refer to:

K-86 (Kansas highway), a state highway in Kansas
INS Nipat (K86), a former Indian Navy ship
HMS Arbutus (K86), aa former UK Royal Navy ship